The ROH World Television Championship is a professional wrestling secondary championship owned by the Ring of Honor (ROH) promotion. On January 20, 2010, the ROH World Television Championship was created by ROH and announced via ROH's official website.

ROH World Television Championships reigns are determined by professional wrestling matches, in which competitors are involved in scripted rivalries. These narratives create feuds between the various competitors, which cast them as villains and heroes. Some reigns were held by champions using a ring name, while others used their real name. Reigns that were won on pay-per-view events aired on tape delay up to weeks or months apart. Reigns that were won at live events were released on DVD as well as the ROH World Championships reigns. The inaugural champion was Eddie Edwards after defeating Davey Richards in the inaugural eight-man ROH World Television Championship Tournament finals.

Jay Lethal's second reign is the longest at 567 days, while Will Ospreay's reign is the shortest at 2 days. Lethal also has the longest combined reign at 798 days. Minoru Suzuki is the oldest champion, winning the title at the age of 53, while Adam Cole is the youngest when he won the title at 22 years. Samoa Joe is the current champion in his first reign. He defeated Minoru Suzuki on April 13, 2022 in New Orleans, Louisiana on AEW Dynamite.

Title history

Combined reigns 

References

External links 

 ROH World Television Title History at Cagematch.net

Ring of Honor championships
ROH World Television Championship